Hendrik de Vos (born 5 October 1969) is a South African cricketer. He played First-class cricket and List A cricket matches for South Africa from 1990 to 2001.

References

External links
 

1969 births
Living people